New George V Stadium is a football stadium in Curepipe, Mauritius. The stadium holds 6,500 people.

History 
The construction of the George V Stadium started in 1954 and the stadium was ready in 1955. In November 2002, the old stadium was demolished and the new stadium was reopened in August 2003 and it was renamed as the New George V Stadium. It was used in the Indian Ocean Island Games in 2003 and has been the national team home ground ever since. However, some matches are also played at the Anjalay Stadium.

References

External links
Photo at worldstadiums.com
Photo at fussballtempel.net
Photo at cafe.daum.net/stade

Curepipe
Football venues in Mauritius
Athletics (track and field) venues in Mauritius